Salvator Léonardi (2 July 1872, Catania – 23 February 1938, Paris) was a mandolin virtuoso, teacher and composer. He taught in Egypt, Malta, London and Paris for more than 20 years, and also toured as a performer. Léonardi learned mandolin and guitar from an uncle, but went on to become a professional musician, studying the violin at a Naples conservatory. He won awards as a solo mandolinist at international music competitions in Florence and Rome.

Léonardi was the author of the Méthode pour Banjoline ou Mandoline-Banjo (Method for Banjolin and Mandolin-Banjo). The book was rare among texts teaching mandolin, because it taught his method in three languages at once, English, French and Spanish. In the third edition of his mandolin-banjo method (1921),  he stated in the introduction that the mandolin had been declining in popularity from previous times. In writing his book, he noted the instrument was soaring in popularity in the shape of the banjo. He did not just recycle old material for his book, but also included his own compositions, including Souvenir de Malta, Caminando (a tango), Souvenir de Rome, Un Beso Por Teléfono, Qui-Pro-Quo, Rêverie, and Capriccio (a polka).

As a music teacher, Léonardi was unsure of whether to include jazz in his book, saying he thought it a faddish style of playing that might not be around very long. In spite of his speculation, he chose to include the section on how to play jazz, noting that he had played with American jazz bands after World War I.

He is known for composing Souvenir de Catania, Souvenir de Napoli, Souvenir de Sicile, and  Angeli e Demoni.

Compositions 

 Souvenir de Sicile
 Souvenir de Naples
 La bella sorrentina for mandolin with guitar or piano
 Angeli e demoni for mandolin
 Cavalleria rusticana
 Valse Fantastique
 Love Song Op. 275
 Danza Dei Nani Op. 43
 Caprice Italien (waltz)
 Caprice Spagnuolo Op. 276 
 La Mystérieuse  Valse (waltz)
 L'entrée des gladiateurs

See also 
 List of mandolinists (sorted)

References

External links 
 
 Records cut by Leonardi around 1909 on la Phonobase
 Introduction to Leonardi's Method for Mandolin book
 Page with mandolin and mandolin-banjo method books in public domain
 Page with banjo instruction manuals, including Salvatore Léonardi's Method for Zither Banjo (French)

1872 births
1938 deaths
19th-century classical composers
19th-century Italian male musicians
20th-century classical composers
20th-century Italian composers
20th-century Italian male musicians
Italian classical composers
Italian classical mandolinists
Italian male classical composers
Italian male writers
Italian music educators
Italian Romantic composers